Lamar Morris (born 1 December 1999) is a British singer, songwriter and dancer. He is known for participating in the British series The Hour. He is also a member of the global pop group Now United, representing the United Kingdom.

Career

2010–2011: early career 
He participated in dance productions with the YMCA Tensing dance team in 2010. He signed with the Rhodes agency drama school. In 2011 Lamar participated in an episode of the British series The Hour.

2017–2020: Now United, solo career 
On 15 November 2017 Lamar's name was revealed as one of the members of the global pop group Now United, being the ninth so far. On 6 December 2017 Lamar, together with the other members of Now United, released "Summer in the City", a preview single.

After his debut in April 2018, Lamar became inactive in the group, returning to small activities, such as performances near England. In September 2018, the film Ruined was released, with Lamar being part of the cast.

In June 2019, Lamar returned to the activities of Now United during the filming of "Crazy Stupid Silly Love", and soon recorded the final version of "Like That". Then, together with Any, he re-recorded "You Give Me Something", and returned to the hiatus, not participating in the group's third tour, Dreams Come True Tour. In 2020, in the quarantine season, Lamar has been doing Take Overs on Now United's Instagram account, participating in video clips and collaborative lives.

Lamar started preparing his first solo album, and his first single already has a release date.

2020–present: Early solo career

On 22 November 2020 the singer Southside Diddy released "Roccstar Disappointments", featuring Lamar.  In 2021, Lamar had his comeback on Now United appearing in the remake of the "Let The Music Move You" video on 1 May, in "Nobody Like Us" on 28 May and then having his second feature clip in "NU Party" on 18 June, where Lamar is credited as songwriter and producer on the song. Still on Now United, Lamar will release another solo song called "My Delicate Flower" on 30 June, with him as a guest appearance in his friend Donrique's song along with Southside Diddy.

Discography

With Now United

Filmography

Documentaries

Awards and nominations

References

External links 
 

1999 births
Living people
People from London
British male singers
Singers from London
British male dancers
Dancers from London
British male actors
Male actors from London
Black British male actors
British people of Barbadian descent
British male models
Models from London
XIX Entertainment artists
Now United members